Amanda Claudino de Andrade (born 20 December 1989) is a Brazilian handball player. She plays for the club UnC/Concórdia and on the Brazilian national team. She represented Brazil at the 2013 World Women's Handball Championship in Serbia.

Achievements
World Championship:
Winner: 2013
Pan American Championship:
Winner: 2015

References

1989 births
Living people
Brazilian female handball players
Pan American Games gold medalists for Brazil
Pan American Games medalists in handball
Handball players at the 2015 Pan American Games
Medalists at the 2015 Pan American Games
21st-century Brazilian women